La Celle is the name or part of the name of nineteen communes of France:

La Celle, Allier, in the Allier département
La Celle, Cher, in the Cher département
La Celle, Puy-de-Dôme, in the Puy-de-Dôme département
La Celle, Var, in the Var département
La Celle-Condé, in the Cher département
La Celle-Dunoise, in the Creuse département
La Celle-en-Morvan, in the Saône-et-Loire département
La Celle-Guenand, in the Indre-et-Loire département
La Celle-les-Bordes, in the Yvelines département
La Celle-Saint-Avant, in the Indre-et-Loire département
La Celle-Saint-Cloud, in the Yvelines département
La Celle-Saint-Cyr, in the Yonne département
La Celle-sous-Chantemerle, in the Marne département
La Celle-sous-Gouzon, in the Creuse département
La Celle-sous-Montmirail, in the Aisne département
La Celle-sur-Loire, in the Nièvre département
La Celle-sur-Morin, in the Seine-et-Marne département
La Celle-sur-Nièvre, in the Nièvre département
Vernou-la-Celle-sur-Seine, in the Seine-et-Marne département

sk:Cérilly